Phocavis is an extinct genus of flightless seabird, belonging to the family Plotopteridae, and distantly related with modern cormorants. Its fossils, found in the Keasey Formation in Oregon, are dated from the Late Eocene.

History and taxonomy

The holotype of Phocavis, LACM 123897, an isolated right tarsometatarsus, was collected in Late Eocene rocks belonging to the Keasey Formation, near Vernonia, Oregon, by James L. Goedert in 1979. The fossil was only described in 1988 as a new genus and species of Plotopteridae, Phocavis maritimus. Due to the lack of existing material on the two described genera of North American plotopterids, Tonsala and Plotopterum, the validity of the genus was only assumed due to the assumed size of the living bird, estimated to be intermediate between the two later genera, and its much older geological age. Comparison could however be made with the then undescribed remains of Copepteryx from Japan to verify the identity of the bone as a fossil of plotopterid.

The genus name, Phocavis, is constructed with the Latin prefix “Phoca-”, meaning seal, and the suffix “-avis”, meaning bird, as a reference of its supposed adaptation towards swimming. The type species name, maritimus, means in Latin “from the sea”.

Description

Phocavis is only known from its holotype tarsometatarsus, which could be identified as belonging to a new genus of plotopterid thanks to comparison with fossil remains of large plotopterids from Japan. The tarsometatarsus was much smaller than its Japanese counterparts, but larger than its later relative Plotopterum maritimus. It was also more elongated, and anatomically distinct from the Japanese plotopterids.

Paleoenvironment

Phocavis is the earliest known genus of plotopterid, dating from the Late Eocene. The Keasey Formation, in which it was found, represents deep sea deposits, at an approximate deposition depth of 500 to 1000 m, possibly indicating that plotopterids were able to venture far from the coast early in their evolution. In the Eocene of this formation are also represented a pseudodontorn, a marine turtle, a cetacean, teleost fish and sharks. The cohabitation between plotopterids and early cetaceans since the Eocene goes against an earlier theory justifying the extinction of the plotopterids during the Miocene by an unequal concurrence with porpoises, and may designate other culprits, such as the dramatic climatic and oceanographic changes in the North Pacific during the Early and Middle Miocene, affecting phytoplanktonic communities and causing the extinction of the specialized plotopterids, in favor of other group such as the enaliarctine pinnipeds.

References

Fossil taxa described in 1988
Plotopteridae
Extinct flightless birds
Prehistoric bird genera